Ljubiša Dimitrovski (born February 25, 2002) is a Macedonian professional basketball shooting guard for Rabotnički.

Professional career
On October 3, 2019, he made his debut for MZT Skopje scoring 2 points in 110-88 win over Sloboda Tuzla at home.

References

External links
 Eurobasket Profile
 ABA 2 Profile

2002 births
Living people
KK MZT Skopje players
Macedonian men's basketball players
Shooting guards